The Mahameghavahana dynasty (2nd or 1st century BC to early 4th century CE) was an ancient ruling dynasty of Kalinga after the decline of the Maurya Empire. In the first century B.C., Mahameghavahana, a king of Chedirastra (or Cetarattha, i.e., kingdom of the Chedis) conquered Kalinga and Kosala. During the reign of Kharavela, the third king of Mahameghavahana dynasty, South Kosala became an integral part of the kingdom. He patronised Jainism, but did not discriminate against other religions. He is known by his Hathigumpha inscription.

South Kosala was later conquered by Gautamiputra Satakarni of the Satavahana dynasty in the early part of the 2nd century CE and remained in their possession up to the second half of the 2nd century CE. It was during the second and third century CE, the Meghas or Meghavahanas reappeared in the political scene and regained their suzerainty over South Kosala. Samudragupta during his Daksinapatha expedition, defeated Mahendra of Kosala who probably belonged to the Megha dynasty. As a result, the South Kosala during the fourth century A.D, became a part of the Gupta empire.

List of rulers
The Hathigumpha inscription describes the following Rulers. It does not directly mention the relationship between Mahameghavahana and Kharavela, or the number of kings between them. Indraji interpreted the inscription to create the following hypothetical family tree:

The Sada dynasty who ruled form Amaravati region in their inscription from Guntapalli describe themselves as Maharaja of Kalinga Mahisaka countries belonging to Mahameghavahana family. They were Maha Sada, Sivamaka Sada and Asaka Sada.

Architecture
Udayagiri and Khandagiri Caves is the most prominent example of Mahameghavahana dynasty work. These caves were built in 2nd century BCE during the rule of King Kharavela. Udayagiri means "Sunrise Hill" and has 18 caves while Khandagiri (means "Broken Hill") has 15 caves. The Hathigumpha cave ("Elephant Cave") has the Hathigumpha inscription, written by Raja Kharavela, the king of Kalinga in India, during the 2nd century BCE. The Hathigumpha inscription consists of seventeen lines incised in deep cut Brahmi letters starting with Jain Namokar Mantra. In Udayagiri, Hathigumpha (cave 14) and Ganeshagumpha (cave 10) are especially well known due to art treasures of their sculptures and reliefs as well as due to their historical importance. Rani ka Naur (Queen's Palace cave, cave 1) is also an extensively carved cave and elaborately embellished with sculptural friezes. Khandagiri offers a fine view back over Bhubaneswar from its summit. The Ananta cave (cave 3) depicts carved figures of women, elephants, athletes, and geese carrying flowers.

References

Citations

Sources

External links
 Map of India depicting Maha-Meghavahana kingdom

 
Jain dynasties
History of Odisha
Dynasties of Odisha
States and territories established in the 3rd century BC
250s BC establishments